Joseph D. E. Konhauser (1924 – February 1992) was an American mathematician who introduced Konhauser polynomials. He was a professor at Macalester College. He also organized many mathematical problems competitions. The annual Konhauser Problemfest is named after him.

Publications

References

History of the Konhauser problemfest

20th-century American mathematicians
1924 births
1992 deaths
Macalester College faculty